Abalai Anjugam is a 1959 Indian Tamil-language drama film produced and directed by R. M. Krishnaswamy. The film, based on the short story of the same name by Ki. Ra. Gopalan, stars T. R. Mahalingam and Sowcar Janaki. It was released on 31 October 1959.

Plot 

Anjugam is a helpless young woman who is pushed into great difficulties including a charge of theft. However, she overcomes them and the story has a happy ending.

Cast 
Compiled from the review article in The Hindu and from the database of Film News Anandan.

Male cast
T. R. Mahalingam
Kuladeivam V. R. Rajagopal
Karikol Raju
C. S. Pandian
Stunt Somu
Goperaj

Female cast
Sowcar Janaki
Rushyendramani
M. N. Rajam
T. A. Mathuram
R. M. Manorama
Leela Bai

Production 
The film is based on the short story of the same name by Ki. Ra. Gopalan.

Soundtrack 
Music was composed by K. V. Mahadevan while the lyrics were penned by Udumalai Narayana Kavi, Suratha, A. Maruthakasi, Thanjai Marimuthu, A. L. Narayanan, Thanjai N. Ramaiah Dass and Kannadasan. After poet Suratha wrote the first para (Pallavi) of the song Vennilaa Kudai Pidikka differences cropped up between him and the composer. The poet refused to write the rest of the song even after any amount of coaxing by Udumalai Narayana Kavi who invited Suratha to write the song. Thereafter Udumalai Narayana Kavi wrote the completing lines of the song. However, credit was given to Suratha only in the film.

Reception 
Kalki wrote . Film historian Randor Guy says the film "fared fairly well at the box office".

References

External links 
 

1950s Tamil-language films
1959 drama films
1959 films
Films based on short fiction
Films scored by K. V. Mahadevan
Indian drama films